
Yongxing (永兴/永興) may refer to:

Locations in China
Yongxing County, county in Hunan
Woody Island (South China Sea), also known as Yongxing Island, one of the Paracel Islands in the South China Sea

Subdistricts
Yongxing Subdistrict, Changchun, a subdistrict in Nanguan District, Changchun, Jilin
Yongxing Subdistrict, Nantong, a subdistrict in Gangzha District, Nantong, Jiangsu
Yongxing Subdistrict, Wenzhou, a subdistrict in Longwan District, Wenzhou, Zhejiang
Yongxing Subdistrict, Yakeshi, a subdistrict in Yakeshi, Inner Mongolia

Towns
Yongxing, Anhui, a town in Lixin County, Anhui
Yongxing, Chongqing, a town in Chongqing
Yongxing, Fujian, a town in Pucheng County, Fujian
Yongxing, Guizhou, a town in Meitan County, Guizhou
Yongxing, Hainan, a town in Haikou, Hainan
Yongxing, Heilongjiang, a town in Mingshui County, Heilongjiang
Yongxing, Zhengyang County, a town in Zhengyang County, Henan
Yongxing, Weishi County, a town in Weishi County, Henan
Yongxing, Hubei, a town in Jingshan County, Hubei
Yongxing, Inner Mongolia, a town in Liangcheng County, Inner Mongolia
Yongxing, Chengdu, a town in Chengdu, Sichuan
Yongxing, Huaying, a town in Huaying, Sichuan
Yongxing, Kaijiang County, a town in Kaijiang County, Sichuan
Yongxing, Mianyang, a town in Mianyang, Sichuan
Yongxing, Mingshan County, a town in Mingshan County, Sichuan
Yongxing, Suining, a town in Suining, Sichuan
Yongxing, Yanbian County, a town in Yanbian County, Sichuan
Yongxing, Yibin County, a town in Yibin County, Sichuan
Yongxing, Zhongjiang County, a town in Zhongjiang County, Sichuan
Yongxing, Gansu, a town in Li County, Gansu

Townships
Yongxing Dai Township, an autonomous township in Yongren County, Yunnan
Yongxing Township, Sichuan, a township in Linshui County, Sichuan

Historical eras
Yongxing (153–154), an era name used by Emperor Huan of Han
Yongxing (304–306), an era name used by Emperor Hui of Jin
Yongxing (350–352), an era name used by Ran Min
Yongxing (357–359), an era name used by Fu Jian (337–385), emperor of Former Qin
Yongxing (409–413), an era name used by Emperor Mingyuan of Northern Wei
Yongxing (532), an era name used by Emperor Xiaowu of Northern Wei